Tristan Harris is an American technology ethicist. He is the executive director and co-founder of the Center for Humane Technology.

Early in his career, Harris worked as a design ethicist at Google. He received his baccalaureate degree from Stanford University, where he studied computer science.

Harris has appeared in the Netflix documentary The Social Dilemma. The film features Harris and other  former tech employees explaining how the design of social media platforms nurtures addiction to maximize profit and manipulates people's views, emotions, and behavior. The film also examines social media's effect on mental health, particularly of adolescents.

Early life and education
Harris was raised in the San Francisco Bay Area. He studied computer science at Stanford University while interning at Apple Inc. He then embarked on a master's degree at Stanford with a focus on Human–Computer Interaction, where he took a class from B. J. Fogg, who runs the Persuasive Technology Lab, before dropping out. At Stanford, Harris was classmates with one of Instagram's founders, Kevin Systrom, and helped create a demo app with the other founder, Mike Krieger.

Career
In 2007, Harris launched a startup called Apture. Google acquired Apture in 2011, and Harris ended up working on Google Inbox.

In February 2013, while working at Google, Harris authored a presentation titled “A Call to Minimize Distraction & Respect Users’ Attention”, which he shared with coworkers. In that presentation, he suggested that Google, Apple and Facebook should "feel an enormous responsibility" to make sure humanity doesn't spend its days buried in a smartphone. The 141-slide deck was eventually viewed by tens of thousands of Google employees and sparked conversations about the company's responsibilities long after he left the company. Harris holds several patents from his previous work at Apple, Wikia, Apture, and Google.

Harris left Google in December 2015 to co-found the 501(c)3 nonprofit organization Time Well Spent, later called the Center for Humane Technology. Through his work at CHT, Harris hoped to re-align technology with humanity's best interest. He asserted that human minds can be hijacked and the choices they make are not as free as they think they are.

At CHT, Harris has advocated for understanding and minimizing the negative impacts of digital technologies. In 2017, he spoke on 60 Minutes with Anderson Cooper about the addictive design of smartphone apps. At a 2019 presentation in San Francisco, he coined the phrase "human downgrading" to describe an interconnected system of mutually reinforcing harms—addiction, distraction, isolation, polarization, fake news—that weakens human capacity, in order to capture human attention.

Harris and other CHT team members were interviewed for the film The Social Dilemma, distributed by Netflix. In it he says about the harms of social media, "Never before in history have 50 designers made decisions that would have an impact on two billion people" about the harms of social media.

In 2021, Harris was named to the TIME 100 Next list.

CHT offers an online course on how to build humane and ethical technology, called The Foundations of Humane Technology, which has received notable media coverage. 

In recent years, Harris has expanded his focus from the attention economy to close the gap between the accelerating pace of technology and risks/externalities it creates, compared to the capacity of culture and its institutions to respond and adequately guard against them. Harris and CHT call this "The Wisdom Gap."

The Atlantic stated in their November 2016 issue that "Harris is the closest thing Silicon Valley has to a conscience." Since then, he has been named on Time 100 Next Leaders Shaping 2021, Rolling Stone’s 25 People Changing the Future, and Fortune’s 25 Ideas that Will Change the Future. He is also the co-host of the podcast, Your Undivided Attention.

Media and other activities
At the TEDTalk 2017 conference, Harris exposed how a handful of tech companies are able to manipulate billions of people to generate billions of dollars in ad revenue. He implored his peers to be more conscious and ethical in shaping the human spirit and human potential through technology. The foundation of his presentation was the Time Well Spent thesis. Time Well Spent was quickly adopted by tech industry giants Facebook, Instagram, YouTube, and Google through the addition of features designed to encourage users to monitor their time online.

Harris continued his advocacy for tech reform. In 2019, the New York Times published his op-ed, "Our Brains Are No Match for Our Technology." In the same year, Harris's thoughts were featured on Fortune’s 25 Ideas that Will Shape the 2020s, alongside world leaders such as Melinda Gates and Malala Yousafzai.

Harris has testified before the United States Congress on multiple occasions. In 2019, Harris gave testimony at the United States Senate's hearing on Optimizing for Engagement: Understanding the Use of Persuasive Technology on Internet Platforms. In 2020, he testified in the House hearing on Americans at Risk: Manipulation and Deception in the Digital Age.

In 2021, Harris provided testimony to the Senate Judiciary Subcommittee on Privacy, Technology and the Law on data privacy and how algorithms are able to influence people's choices and effectively change their minds. In his testimony, Harris encouraged lawmakers and social media designers to reset their criteria for success. According to Harris, "Instead of evaluating whether my fellow Facebook, Twitter and YouTube panelists have improved their content policies or hired more content moderators, we should ask what would collectively constitute a 'humane' Western digital democratic infrastructure that would strengthen our capacity to meet these threats."

In October 2022, Harris joined the Council for Responsible Social Media project launched by Issue One to address the negative mental, civic, and public health impacts of social media in the United States co-chaired by former House Democratic Caucus Leader Dick Gephardt and former Massachusetts Lieutenant Governor Kerry Healey.

References

External links 
 
 

Stanford University alumni
Businesspeople from the San Francisco Bay Area
Google people
Living people
American ethicists
Philosophers from California
21st-century American philosophers
21st-century American businesspeople
American computer scientists
1984 births